"Maybe I'm a Fool" is a song by American rock singer, Eddie Money, from his album Life for the Taking in 1978. It was the first of two single releases from the LP, and was the bigger hit.

The song reached #22 on the U.S. Billboard Hot 100 and #28 in Canada in early 1979. It was also a modest hit in Australia (#51).

References

Eddie Money songs
1979 singles
Song recordings produced by Bruce Botnick
1978 songs
Songs written by Eddie Money
Columbia Records singles